is a Japanese politician and member of the House of Representatives, representing the Tokyo 2nd district. He is a member of the Liberal Democratic Party.

Tsuji was born in Tokyo to a Japanese mother and Japanese-Canadian father. He lived in Vancouver from the ages of four to seventeen. He graduated from Kyoto University and worked for Recruit. After attending graduate school at Columbia University, he worked as a researcher at the Center for Strategic and International Studies, where he worked alongside future LDP lawmaker Shinjiro Koizumi.

He was elected to the Diet in the 2012 election, defeating DPJ candidate Yoshikatsu Nakayama. Tsuji ran to replace veteran LDP lawmaker Takashi Fukaya, and personally lobbied Fukaya for support. Fukaya publicly endorsed Tsuji and featured prominently in his 2012 and 2014 campaigns.

Tsuji was re-elected in the 2017 general election, defeating CDP candidate Akihiro Matsuo.

References

External links
 Official site

1979 births
Living people
Members of the House of Representatives from Tokyo
Liberal Democratic Party (Japan) politicians
Japanese people of Canadian descent
Kyoto University alumni
Columbia University alumni
Recruit (company)